Atko-Meeme Viru (7 September 1932 Tallinn – 21 October 2007 Tartu) was an Estonian basketballer, sport personnel, sport scientist biologist and educator.

In 1955 he graduated from Tartu State University in physical education.

In 1950 he played in Estonian national basketball team. In 1952, 1956 and 1958 he become Estonian champion.

Since 1959 (since 1974 professor) he has taught at the University of Tartu.

1989–2003 he was a member of Estonian Olympic Committee.

Awards:
 2001: Order of the Estonian Red Cross, V class.

References

1932 births
2007 deaths
Estonian men's basketball players
Estonian people in sports
Estonian scientists
Estonian biologists
Estonian educators
University of Tartu alumni
Academic staff of the University of Tartu
Basketball players from Tallinn